Lucjan Kydryński (January 6, 1929 in Grudziądz – September 9, 2006 in Warszawa) was a Polish journalist and writer, radio and TV program host.

His activities include writing satire for Przekrój, being the host of the National Festival of Polish Song in Opole and Sopot Festival.

On September 14, 2006, Polish President Lech Kaczyński posthumously awarded Lucjan Kydryński with the Officer's Cross of the Order of Polonia Restituta for his contributions to Polish culture.

Family
Wife: Halina Kunicka, singer, son: Marcin Kydryński, music journalist, producer, composer, songwriter, Anna Maria Jopek, musician and singer, wife of Marcin Kydryński.

Bibliography
Przejazdem przez życie...: kroniki rodzinne, Kraków, 2005, Wydawnictwo Literackie, 
 Przewodnik operetkowy: wodewil, operetka, musical
 Marek i Wacek – historia prawdziwa, 1990, 
Przewodnik po filmach muzycznych, 2000, Polskie Wydawnictwo Muzyczne,
Gershwin, 1998, Polskie Wydawnictwo Muzyczne, 
Jan Strauss, Polskie Wydawnictwa Muzyczne, 1979
Opera na cały rok, Kraków, 1989

References

1929 births
2006 deaths
People from Grudziądz
Polish male writers
Polish radio journalists
Polish television journalists
Officers of the Order of Polonia Restituta
20th-century Polish journalists